Route 280 is an  local highway in northeast New Brunswick, Canada.

Communities along Route 280
 McLeods
 Upper Dundee
 Shannonvale
 Dundee
 Eel River Cove
 Charlo

See also
List of New Brunswick provincial highways

References

New Brunswick provincial highways
Roads in Restigouche County, New Brunswick